Cousland Castle is a ruined castle near the town of Cousland, Midlothian, Scotland.

Structure
The 16th century ruins of the tower house and enclosure walls are all that remains. The original 15th century tower house was extended in the 16th century to form a larger residence. The basement of the tower is vaulted. The house was demolished after 1760, and the walls survive intact on the northern sides. The tower, house and walls are protected as a scheduled monument.

History
Cousland was a hunting lodge of the St Clair of Roslin family. Henry Sinclair, Lord Sinclair sold Cousland to William Ruthven, Lord Ruthven in 1493. The castle was  burned by Patrick Charteris as a result of a feud with William Ruthven, 2nd Lord Ruthven in 1529. Following the Battle of Pinkie in 1547, the castle was slighted by Edward Seymour, Duke of Somerset.

Cousland was forfeited by John Ruthven, 3rd Earl of Gowrie and was later granted to Hugh Herries. The castle passed from the Herries family, to the Hays of Kinnoull, before passing to the Makgill family in the 17th century.

In the late 17th century, Cousland was known to be in the ownership of John Dalrymple, 1st Earl of Stair.

References

Ruined castles in Scotland
Castles in Midlothian
Scheduled monuments in Scotland